The Forest Municipal School District is a public school district based in Forest, Mississippi (USA).

In addition to almost all of Forest, the district also serves most of Hillsboro, and rural areas in south central Scott County.

Schools
Forest High School (Grades 9-12)
Hawkins Middle School (Grades 5-8)
Forest Elementary School (Grades K-4)

Demographics

2006-07 school year
There were a total of 1,550 students enrolled in the Forest Municipal School District during the 2006–2007 school year. The gender makeup of the district was 48% female and 52% male. The racial makeup of the district was 65.55% African American, 20.84% White, 13.35% Hispanic, and 0.26% Asian. 73.6% of the district's students were eligible to receive free lunch.

Previous school years

Accountability statistics

See also
List of school districts in Mississippi

References

External links
Forest Municipal School District

Education in Scott County, Mississippi
School districts in Mississippi